le Pelley is a surname, and may refer to:

 Daniel le Pelley (died 1752), Seigneur of Sark
 Ernest le Pelley (1801–1849), Seigneur of Sark
 Georges René Le Peley de Pléville (1726–1805), French admiral
 Nicolas le Pelley (1692–1742), Seigneur of Sark
 Pierre Carey le Pelley (19th century), Seigneur of Sark
 Pierre Dumanoir le Pelley (1770–1829), French Navy officer
 Pierre le Pelley I (1736–1778), Seigneur of Sark
 Pierre le Pelley II (18th century), Seigneur of Sark
 Pierre le Pelley III (died 1839), Seigneur of Sark
 Susanne le Pelley (1668–1733), Dame of Sark

See also

 Pelley